KZSO-LP (94.9 FM) was a radio station broadcasting a variety music format. Licensed to Sisters, Oregon, United States, the station was owned by Sisters School District #6, Deschutes County.

KZSO-LP was run by students at Sisters High School. The students ran a daily radio show that focused on news from all across the globe, weather, and sports.

The school district surrendered the station's license to the Federal Communications Commission (FCC) on March 18, 2016; the FCC cancelled the license on March 22, 2016.

References

External links
 

ZSO-LP
ZSO-LP
Deschutes County, Oregon
Sisters, Oregon
Radio stations established in 2006
2006 establishments in Oregon
Defunct radio stations in the United States
Radio stations disestablished in 2016
2016 disestablishments in Oregon
Defunct community radio stations in the United States
ZSO-LP